Argyresthia plicipunctella is a species of moth of the  family Yponomeutidae. It is found in North America, including California and Oregon.

The wingspan is about 10 mm. The forewings are white, suffused and sprinkled with greyish brown, especially in the costal and apical parts, while the dorsal part below the fold is nearly pure white. The hindwings are light ochreous fuscous.

References

Moths described in 1890
Argyresthia
Moths of North America